This is a list of African-American newspapers that have been published in the state of Utah.

Although new African-American newspapers continued to be established in Utah through at least the 1990s, many of the state's historical African-American newspapers date to a period of journalistic ferment between 1890 and 1910. During the late 19th and early 20th centuries, the state's African-American population grew, reaching 1,144 in 1910. The state's first African-American newspapers, The Broad Ax and the Utah Plain Dealer, were both established in 1895, and several others followed soon after. Many of these early local papers were members of the Western Negro Press Association, which held its fifth annual meeting in Salt Lake City in 1900. The Plain Dealer was the longest-lasting of the early papers, running for more than a decade from 1895 to 1909.

Newspapers

See also

List of African-American newspapers and media outlets
List of African-American newspapers in Arizona
List of African-American newspapers in Colorado
List of African-American newspapers in Nevada
List of newspapers in Utah

Works cited

References

Newspapers
Utah
African-American
African-American newspapers